A Diarista (in Portuguese, literally "The Daily Help") is a Brazilian television sitcom directed by José Alvarenga Jr. and written by Aloísio de Abreu and Bruno Mazzeo. The series aired from 13 April 2004 to 31 July 2007 on Rede Globo.

Plot
It shows the life and problems of Marinete (Cláudia Rodrigues), a cleaning lady with a short temper. She always ends up depending on her friends, who are distracted by any stupid thing and leave her to solve things on her own.

Cast
 Claúdia Rodrigues as Marinete / Maria Elizabeth 
 Dira Paes as Solineuza / Sônia Neiva
 Sérgio Loroza as Figueirinha
 Helena Fernandes as Ipanema de Jesus (seasons 2–4)
 Cláudia Mello as Dalila
 Renata Castro Barbosa as Gislene (seasons 1–3)
 Leandro Firmino as Figueira (season 1)

Pilot
The pilot episode was written by Glória Perez and was aired on 21 December 2003 on Sunday at 11:00 PM.

Seasons

2000s sitcoms
2004 Brazilian television series debuts
2007 Brazilian television series endings
Brazilian comedy television series
Portuguese-language television shows
Rede Globo original programming
Telenovelas by Glória Perez